Courtney Johnston (born ) is a New Zealand museum professional, a national radio correspondent, and the chief executive of the Museum of New Zealand Te Papa Tongarewa.

Early life and education
Born in about 1979, Johnston grew up on dairy farm in Taranaki, later moving to Wellington to study and work as a visitor host at Te Papa. In 2004 she earned a master's degree in art history from Victoria University of Wellington, with a thesis on art historian Peter Tomory.

Career
Johnston has lived and worked in Wellington with roles at a variety of galleries and cultural institutions, including the Adam Art Gallery, City Gallery Wellington, and from 2012 to 2018 was the director of the Dowse Art Museum after roles at the National Library of New Zealand and Boost New Media where she worked in communications and web roles.

In 2019, Johnston became the youngest chief executive to head The Museum of New Zealand Te Papa Tongarewa. She is also a board member of Arts Wellington and the Wellington Performing Arts Trust and the immediate past chair of the umbrella group Museums Aotearoa.

She has worked as an arts correspondent for Radio New Zealand's "Nine to Noon" programme since 2010.

Awards
Johnston was the 2015 recipient of a Winston Churchill Memorial Trust travel grant for researching contemporary museum practices in the U.S.

References

External links
 Courtney Johnston interviews on Radio New Zealand
 Courtney Johnston on Twitter

1970s births
Year of birth missing (living people)
Living people
People associated with the Museum of New Zealand Te Papa Tongarewa
Women museum directors
Directors of museums in New Zealand
Victoria University of Wellington alumni
21st-century New Zealand writers
New Zealand radio presenters
New Zealand women radio presenters
People from Taranaki